The Hunchback of Notre Dame was a 1911 French silent film directed by Albert Capellani and produced by Pathé Frères. It was released under the name Notre-Dame de Paris. It starred Henry Krauss and Stacia Napierkowska. The film was based on the 1831 Victor Hugo novel of the same name.  Considering the film's brief running time, critic Christopher Workman considered it "remarkably faithful to its source material" but it "contains no discernible humor, unlike most other horror films of the period, and thus represents a bellwether of sorts for the genre....(Henry Krauss as Quasimodo) "looks remarkably like Charles Ogle in (Thomas) Edison's 1910 Frankenstein."

Although the film vilified organized Christianity by portraying members of the clergy as "sadistic and duplicitous", it was theatrically released in the USA in December 1911, shortly before Christmas.

Plot
Esmeralda, a Romani girl, is the darling of the people around Notre Dame Cathedral in Paris. Three men are romantically interested in her: Phöebus, the commander of the city guard, Quasimodo the bell ringer of Notre Dame and Claudius Frollo, the archdeacon of the cathedral. The latter, however, is confused by his strong affection for Esmeralda and cannot resolve the conflict caused by his vow of celibacy. Out of jealousy, he stabs a knife in Phöebus's back when he meets with Esmeralda in an inn. Esmeralda is falsely accused and charged with this crime. The resultant death sentence is to be executed on the forecourt of the cathedral. Quasimodo rescues Esmeralda and brings her up into the bell tower to safety  but Frollo violates the sanctuary and has Esmeralda executed by hanging. Quasimodo then angrily throws Frollo from the bell tower to his death.

Cast
Henry Krauss as Quasimodo 
Stacia Napierkowska as Esméralda
René Alexandre as Phoebus de Châteaupers 
Claude Garry as Claude Frollo 
Jean Angelo   
Paul Capellani     
Jean Dax   
Mévisto

References

External links
 

1911 films
1910s historical drama films
French black-and-white films
French historical drama films
French silent short films
Films directed by Albert Capellani
Films based on The Hunchback of Notre-Dame
Films set in Paris
Films set in religious buildings and structures
Films set in the 1480s
1911 drama films
Films about Romani people
Silent drama films
Silent horror films
1910s French films